1909 Országos Bajnokság I (men's water polo) was the sixth water polo championship in Hungary. There were two teams who played one match for the title.

Final list

* M: Matches W: Win D: Drawn L: Lost G+: Goals earned G-: Goals got P: Point

Sources
Gyarmati Dezső: Aranykor (Hérodotosz Könyvkiadó és Értékesítő Bt., Budapest, 2002.)

1909 in water polo
1909 in Hungarian sport
Seasons in Hungarian water polo competitions